The House of Meyerhold is a historic building in Penza, Russia.  It currently houses a museum and theatre, the GBUK Centre of Theatrical Arts "Meyerhold's House".

History
The house was built from wood in 1881 as part of a manor complex for the Penza merchant and winemaker Emil Teodorovich Meyerhold. The estate included a winery and outbuildings. The house has a cellar, and a total area of 340 sq.m. It was restored between 1979 and 1982, preserving the original layout and design of the facade. The house was a childhood home of Russian and Soviet theatre director, actor and theatrical producer Vsevolod Meyerhold, from 1881 to 1895. The house of has the status of an object of an object of cultural heritage of federal significance, by Decree of the Council of Ministers of the RSFSR, No. 624, on 4 December 1974.

Museum
The museum was opened on 24 February 1984, to commemorate 110 years since Vsevolod Meyerhold's birth in 1874. On its opening it became the first memorial established to Meyerhold. Meyerhold's granddaughter, Maria Alekseyevna Valentey, donated items and artefacts to the museum, whose collections now contain around 10,000 items, and include documents, manuscripts, and photographs.

In 1994, the museum exhibition was reworked to be entirely devoted to the life and work of Vsevolod Meyerhold. International conferences were held at the museum in 1989 and 1994, to mark the 115th and 120th anniversaries of Meyerhold's birth. In 1989, the state experimental theatre studio Proscenium opened at the museum. On 20 November 1999, the world's first monument to Vsevolod Meyerhold, a bronze statue sculpted by Penza resident Yury E. Tkachenko, was unveiled on the museum's grounds. That year the exposition "The Life and Work of Vs. Meyerhold" was opened in the museum.

Pavel Rudnev was the artistic director of Vsevolod Meyerhold Center from 2004 to 2011.

In 2014, the exhibition "Meyerhold. Chronicles" was opened to celebrate the 140th anniversary of Meyerhold's birth. The exhibition covers Meyerhold's time living in Penza. In 2023 the museum joined the Association of Theatre Museums.

References

External links 
 of Theatrical Arts «House of Meyerhold»
 Center of Theatrical Arts «House of Meyerhold», Penza Oblast Ministry of culture official website
 of Theatrical Arts «House of Meyerhold», Penza Oblast government official site 
 Center of Theatrical Arts «House of Meyerhold»,  III Summer Spartakiada (Penza, 2007) site

Art museums and galleries in Russia
Penza
Art museums established in 1984
1984 establishments in Russia
Museums in Penza Oblast
Historic house museums in Russia
Cultural heritage monuments of federal significance in Penza Oblast